Shelburne (2016 population 8,126) is a town in Dufferin County, Ontario, Canada, is located at the intersection of Highway 10 and Highway 89. Shelburne hosts the Annual Canadian Championship Old Time Fiddling Contest that is held each August.

History
In the early 1860s, the founder of the town Shelburne, William Jelly, found his way through the bushes to choice lots in Melancthon and built several cabins in the area.

As Melancthon began developing in the late 1840s, the construction of the Toronto-Sydenham Road (now Highway 10) began and led to settlers moving into the Shelburne area in the 1860s. In 1865, William Jelly established the British Canadian Hotel. A post office was built shortly after, named after the Earl of Shelburne. Rapid economic growth followed and the population increased from 70 villagers in 1869 to 750 villagers in 1877, due to the new railways that were built. Shelburne was incorporated as a town in 1877.

Demographics

Economy
Major local employers have included automotive part manufacturers Johnson Controls (until 2009) and KTH Manufacturing.  Other major companies include Ice River Springs and its Blue Mountain Plastics subsidiary. The latter manufactures water bottles from recycled plastics using 29,000 tonnes of plastic annually, obtained from municipal recycling programmes. In July 2020, the company announced that it would be buying all of the Canadian bottling operations of Nestlé Waters.

An industrial area has been established in the south end of town. Roads have been constructed to provide access to potential industries. The objective of this industrial area is to encourage industrial growth within the town. Shelburne is also home to a small retail sector and many residents commute to Orangeville, Brampton and other centres in the Greater Toronto Area.

Education
Shelburne is part of the Upper Grand District School Board. The town's high school is Centre Dufferin District High School.  Elementary schools include Glenbrook Elementary, Hyland Heights Elementary and Centennial Hylands Elementary.

Local government

The Town's Council includes the Mayor, Deputy Mayor, and five Councillors elected on the basis of one per ward. The members of council elected as of the 2018 Municipal Election  are:

Mayor Acclaimed: Wade Mills

Deputy Mayor: Shane Hall 

Councillors:

 Walter Benotto
 Lindsay Wegener
 Dan Sample
 Kyle Fregan
 Len Guchardi

Emergency services

The residents of the town are protected by the Ontario Provincial Police. Formerly protected by members of the Shelburne Police Service from 1879 to 2021.

Fire protection is provided by the Shelburne and District Fire Department with one station.

Media 

The Shelburne Free Press publishes weekly in Shelburne. CFDC-FM 104.9, licensed to and based in Shelburne, broadcasts country music on 104.9, branded as Country 105. The regional weekly Orangeville Banner is also distributed to Shelburne.

Sports teams
Shelburne Muskies - WOAA Senior AA Hockey League- Shelburne Cricket Club - SCC House League and Dufferin County Cup - DCC

Notable residents
 Eric Nagler — singer, actor
 Jesse Sebastiani — YouTuber (NELK)
 Aaron Downey — Former NHL player
 Harry Gozzard — jazz musician from big band era
 Ruby Waters - singer/songwriter

See also

 List of towns in Ontario

References

External links

Lower-tier municipalities in Ontario
Municipalities in Dufferin County
Towns in Ontario